The 2016 Karjala Tournament was played between 3–6 November 2016. The Czech Republic, Finland, Sweden and Russia played a round-robin for a total of three games per team and six games in total. Five of the matches were played in the Hartwall Arena in Helsinki, Finland, and one match in the CEZ Arena in Plzeň, Czech Republic. The tournament was won by Russia. The tournament is part of 2016–17 Euro Hockey Tour.

Standings

Games
All times are local.
Helsinki – (Eastern European Time – UTC+2) Plzen – (Central European Time – UTC+1)

Scoring leaders
GP = Games played; G = Goals; A = Assists; Pts = Points; +/− = Plus/minus; PIM = Penalties in minutes; POS = PositionSource: Swehockey

Goaltending leaders
TOI = Time On Ice (minutes:seconds); SA = Shots against; GA = Goals against; GAA = Goals against average; Sv% = Save percentage; SO = ShutoutsSource: Swehockey

References

Karjala
Karjala
Karjala Tournament
November 2016 sports events in Europe
2016–17 Euro Hockey Tour
2010s in Helsinki
Sport in Plzeň